Vathylakkos is a village and a community of the municipality of Servia. The 2011 census recorded 615 inhabitants in the community. The community of Vathylakkos covers an area of 16.498 km2.

See also
 List of settlements in the Kozani regional unit

References

Populated places in Kozani (regional unit)